Ramsinh Rathwa is Indian politician from Gujarat and belong to Bhartiya Janata Party.

He was member of Rajya Sabha from Gurarat for two terms during 1982–1994. In 1999 he was elected to 13th Lok Sabha from Chhota Udaipur (Lok Sabha constituency). He was elected for second time to 15th Lok sabha in 2009.

He is born on 1 June 1951 at Pipaldi village in Kawant Taluka of Vadodara district and resides there.

References

1951 births
India MPs 2009–2014
India MPs 1999–2004
Lok Sabha members from Gujarat
Living people
India MPs 2014–2019
People from Chhota Udaipur district
People from Vadodara district
Rathwa Ramsinh
Bharatiya Janata Party politicians from Gujarat